The Maldives men's national volleyball team represents Maldives in international volleyball competitions and friendly matches. Last Ranking in FIVB World Rankings is 65th.

References

National sports teams of the Maldives
National men's volleyball teams
Volleyball in the Maldives